Mesoscale  may refer to:
 Mesoscale meteorology
 Mesoscopic scale in physics
 Mesoscale manufacturing 
 Mesoscale eddies